Alpaïs (Alpaida, Alpaidis) of Cudot (died 1211) is venerated by the Catholic Church as a Blessed.  Born into a peasant family of Cudot, in the diocese of Sens, she was stricken with leprosy at a young age. Her vita was written ca. 1180 by the monk Peter of the nearby Cistercian monastery of Les Écharlis.

She denied herself food, and it is said that for a long time her only nourishment was the Eucharist.  A story related of her states that once, she was brought pieces of pork to suck on by the prior of Cudot. Horrified by this, she sent the pork morsels to an old woman of the district to whom she usually sent table scraps and who was even poorer than she was.

Her cultus was confirmed by Pius IX in 1874. Her remains lay in the Church of Notre-Dame, Cudot.

From the Life of Alpais of Cudot
And blessed Mary said to [Alpais]: "...because, dear sister, you bore long starvation in humility and patience, in hunger and thirst, without any murmuring, I grant you now to be fattened with an angelic and spiritual food.  And as long as you are in this little body, corporeal food and drink will not be necessary for the sustaining of your body, nor will you hunger for bread or any other food... because after you have once tasted the celestial bread and drunk of the living fountain you will remain fattened for eternity..."  And so it was… But in order that the tumult of gossip be quieted, since some said she had a devil –she who neither ate nor drank- two or three times a week she was accustomed to accept some morsel... and then spit it back…around for a time in her mouth... and then spit it back whole... And I give this on my own testimony since I received in my own hand a little bit of masticated fish she spit out... Thus, rejoicing as if possessed, she frequently vomited from too much food, as if her drunkenness and inebriation were increased by anything beyond a tiny bit.  And this was how and of what sort her preservation was, how and of what nature were the beginnings of her conversion, and how God underlined her merits and virtues with miracles... by which miracles manifest signs are given to the readers of [this story].

Notes

External links
Saints of November 3: Alpais of Cudot 

French beatified people
12th-century births
1211 deaths
13th-century venerated Christians
People from Yonne
12th-century French people
12th-century French women
13th-century French people
13th-century French women